Knox Breckenridge Burger (November 1, 1922 – January 4, 2010) was an editor, writer, and literary agent who lived in New York City. He published Kurt Vonnegut's first short-story and with his wife he founded Knox Burger & Associates, a literary agency.

Early life
Burger was born in New York City and lived in early life in Westchester County. Carl Burger, his father, was an illustrator.

While serving in World War II, Burger contributed to Yank, the Army Weekly 1943–1944. In a B-29 bomb squadron in the Marianas, Burger covered a number of missions over Japan, and was transferred to the Yank Saipan bureau late summer 1945 just before the Japanese surrender. Burger moved north to Tokyo, where he was, for a few months, the editor of the Far East edition of Yank, and wrote numerous stories about the occupation.

Burger, like his father, the author and illustrator Carl Burger, graduated from Cornell University.

Career
After the war, Burger worked as the fiction editor of Collier's. He then moved on to editing for Dell and Fawcett Publications. In 1970, he founded Knox Burger and Associates, a literary agency which later merged with the Harold Ober agency.

Burger worked with writers including Kurt Vonnegut, John D. MacDonald, John Steinbeck, Ray Bradbury, Lawrence Block, Jack Finney, Horace McCoy, Walter Tevis, MacKinlay Kantor, Morris West, Philip Cammarata, Donald Westlake, Martin Cruz Smith, and Louis L'Amour. In 1980 he sold "Gorky Park" to Random House for $1 million.

In 2000, Knox Burger donated his archive to the Fales Library of New York University.

Notes

Cornell University alumni
American book editors
Writers from New York City
1922 births
2010 deaths
United States Army Air Forces personnel of World War II